The 1930–31 1re série season was the 15th season of the 1re série, the top level of ice hockey in France. Chamonix Hockey Club won their seventh league title.

Final
 Chamonix Hockey Club - Club des Sports d’Hiver de Paris 4:1 (2:0, 2:1, 0:0)

External links
Season on hockeyarchives.info

Fra
1930–31 in French ice hockey
Ligue Magnus seasons